Walton Motors is a Bangladeshi motorcycle manufacturer established in 1977 as a subsidiary of Walton Group. Walton is the first motorcycle manufacturer in Bangladesh, its products being chiefly motorcycles with displacements ranging from 80cc to 150cc, and has marketed and sold them in a number of countries.

References

External links
 Walton BD website

Motorcycle manufacturers of Bangladesh
Manufacturing companies based in Dhaka
Walton Group